Shuntian may refer to:

Shuntian Prefecture, a Ming and Qing era political division around Beijing
Beijing itself, by metonymy
Jiangsu Shuntian or Jiangsu Sainty FC, a Chinese football club

Historical eras
Shuntian (759–761), era name used by Shi Siming
Shuntian (895–896), era name used by Dong Chang (warlord)

See also
Thuận Thiên (disambiguation), the corresponding spelling in Vietnamese
Suncheon, a city in South Korea